Henry Patrick Rohlman (March 17, 1876 – September 13, 1957) was a German-born prelate of the Roman Catholic Church. He served as bishop of the Diocese of Davenport in Iowa from 1927 to 1944 and as coadjutor archbishop and archbishop of the Archdiocese of Dubuque in Iowa from 1944 to 1954.

Biography

Early life 
Rohlman was born on March 17, 1876, in Appelhuelsen, Westphalia (present day Germany), to Bernard and Bernadine (Hussman) Rohlman. When he was two years old, his family immigrated to the United States, settling in Carroll County, Iowa. They moved to Arkansas where both of his parents died. Henry was moved to Nebraska where he finished elementary school and worked on a farm. 

With financial assistance from the people from Carroll County, Rohlman was able to study in the high school department at St. Lawrence Seminary in Mount Calvary, Wisconsin. Rohlman then graduated from Columbia College in Dubuque. He studied for the priesthood at the Grand Seminary of Montreal in Montreal, Quebec.

Priesthood 
Rohlman was ordained a priest by Archbishop Paul Bruchesi in Montreal for the Archdiocese of Dubuque on December 21, 1901.

Rohlman engaged in pastoral work in Dubuque  before attending The Catholic University of America in Washington, D.C., with a view to becoming a missionary. When he returned to Dubuque he was assigned to the Apostolate, which preached parish missions in the archdiocese as well as in the other dioceses in Iowa. He became pastor at St. Mary's Church in Waterloo before serving as business manager at Columbia College. In the early 1920s, Rohlman was asked to form Nativity parish in Dubuque.

Bishop of Davenport 
On May 20, 1927, Pope Pius XI named Rohlman the fourth bishop of the Diocese of Davenport. Rohlman was consecrated by Archbishop James Keane of Dubuque in St. Raphael's Cathedral on July 25, 1927.  He was installed the next day as Bishop of Davenport in Sacred Heart Cathedral. The principal co-consecrators were Bishops Edmond Heelan of Sioux City and Thomas Drumm of Des Moines.

In 1928 Rohlman commissioned a study to assess the social problems in the diocese. The result of this study was the establishment of Catholic Charities in 1929. He named the Rev. Martin Cone as its first director. Its immediate focus was the welfare of the children at St. Vincent's Home in Davenport.

Two colleges for women were started in the diocese during Rohlman's episcopate. The Sisters of St. Francis in Clinton established Mt. St. Clare College (later Ashford University) in 1928. It was an extension of their academy, which had been established in the 1890s. St. Ambrose College started a woman's division in 1934 and continued to support it as it searched for a religious order of women to take it over. In 1937 property was secured for a woman's college in Davenport on the west side of the city. The Congregation of the Humility of Mary at Rohlman's urging established Marycrest College in 1939 from the woman's division of St. Ambrose.

The diocese celebrated its Golden Jubilee in 1931. The next year Rohlman convoked the diocese's third synod. The synod was called to bring the diocese's regulations in line with the Code of Canon Law which had been promulgated in 1917. It also set the salary for pastors at $1,000 per year, plus household expenses, and associate pastors and chaplain's salaries were set at $500. Catholic Charities had set up their offices in the Kahl Building. They were joined in 1932 with the chancery and the newly established superintendent of schools. All of these offices and the bishop's office moved into a property on Church Square behind St. Anthony's Church downtown. It was renamed the Cosgrove Building after Davenport's second bishop, Henry Cosgrove.

Rohlman had the difficult task of leading the diocese through the Great Depression and World War II. The Catholic Messenger, an independent Catholic newspaper published in Davenport, was experiencing financial problems during the Depression and was purchased by the diocese for use as a diocesan newspaper in 1937. 

Until Rohlman came to the diocese only five priests had been recognized for their contributions to the church by being given a papal honor, all of them from Bishop Davis. Rohlman named monsignors every two years. By the time he returned to Dubuque, twenty-four priests had been honored and five were recognized twice. Rohlman served as Bishop of Davenport for 17 years until September 8, 1944, when he was named to Dubuque.

Archbishop of Dubuque 
During the early 1940s, Archbishop Francis Beckman of Dubuque had involved the archdiocese in a dubious financial scheme. Beckman had been talked into investing borrowed money in gold mines with the idea that the profits could be used to further an art collection he had established at Columbia College. However, the scheme was soon revealed to be a fraud, and the man behind the scheme was arrested. Because Beckman had signed loans in the archdiocese's name, it led to financial difficulties for the archdiocese when the holders of the notes began demanding repayment. Because of the financial problems surrounding Beckman, Bishop Rohlman was transferred to Dubuque by Pope Pius XII and named Titular Archbishop of Macra and Coadjutor Archbishop of Dubuque. It was made clear to Beckman that while he retained the title "Archbishop of Dubuque", Rohlman was now the leader of the archdiocese. On November 11, 1946, Archbishop Beckman retired from office and left Dubuque. Rohlman automatically became the seventh bishop and fifth archbishop of Dubuque.

While Rohlman was archbishop, Christ the King Chapel was constructed at Loras College, St. Mary's Home for Children was built in Dubuque, and the number of priests in the archdiocese rose from 290 to 345. Rohlman, along with the other bishops in Iowa, re-established Mt. St Bernard's Seminary for the education of new priests in the province.  A new $2.5 million building was constructed to house the seminary in Dubuque.

On August 10, 1945, the Diocese of Omaha was elevated to an archdiocese. At that time the Province of Dubuque was reduced in size to the four dioceses in the state of Iowa.

On August 3, 1946, Pope Pius XII appointed a Dubuque priest, Edward Fitzgerald, as the first auxiliary bishop in the archdiocese. He assisted Rohlman until he was appointed Bishop of Winona on October 20, 1949. In 1949, Rohlman requested a coadjutor archbishop. Bishop Leo Binz of Winona was transferred to Dubuque,

Retirement and legacy
Rohlman's resignation as archbishop of Dubuque was accepted by Pope Pius XII on December 2, 1954. He was named the Titular Archbishop of Cotrada. 

Henry Rohlman died on September 13, 1957, at age 81 in Dubuque.  He is buried in the mortuary chapel at St. Raphael's Cathedral.

There are two residence halls named Rohlman Hall after the Archbishop, one at Loras College in Dubuque and one at St. Ambrose University in Davenport. The former Marycrest College in Davenport also named a building in his honor.

References

External links
Archbishop Rohlman's Grave

1876 births
1957 deaths
St. Ambrose University
20th-century Roman Catholic archbishops in the United States
Loras College alumni
German emigrants to the United States
Catholic University of America alumni
Roman Catholic bishops of Davenport
German-American culture in Iowa
Roman Catholic archbishops of Dubuque